Beli Kamen is a Serbo-Croatian place name, meaning "white stone". It may refer to several places:
Beli Kamen, Lučani, Serbia
Beli Kamen, Prokuplje, Serbia
Beli Kamen, Kočevje, Slovenia

Serbo-Croatian place names